Célio Ferreira dos Santos (born July 20, 1987), or simply Célio Santos, is a Brazilian footballer who plays as a defender for Malaysia Super League club Kuching City.

Honours

Club
SCG Muangthong United
 Thai League Cup (1): 2017
 Mekong Club Championship (1): 2017

Eligibility controversy
An inquiry held by the Prime Minister of East Timor in 2016, heard that Celio Santos was one of seven Brazilian footballers to receive falsified baptism documents from Timor's Catholic Church, in order to make it appear he was eligible for Timorese nationality.

All seven players were based in Asia at the time, but only one, Juninho, has played for Timor's controversial national side.

It is unclear when Célio Santos received his Timorese passport, which he received despite having no known means of eligibility, such as a family connection, or residency.

References

External links 
 

1987 births
Living people
Brazilian footballers
Brazilian expatriate footballers
Association football defenders
Beijing Renhe F.C. players
FC Dacia Chișinău players
Avaí FC players
Ulsan Hyundai FC players
Celio Santos
Liga I players
K League 1 players
Chinese Super League players
Expatriate footballers in Iran
Brazilian expatriate sportspeople in Iran
Expatriate footballers in the United Arab Emirates
Brazilian expatriate sportspeople in the United Arab Emirates
Expatriate footballers in China
Brazilian expatriate sportspeople in China
Expatriate footballers in Portugal
Brazilian expatriate sportspeople in Portugal
Expatriate footballers in Moldova
Brazilian expatriate sportspeople in Moldova
Expatriate footballers in Ukraine
Brazilian expatriate sportspeople in Ukraine
Expatriate footballers in South Korea
Brazilian expatriate sportspeople in South Korea
Expatriate footballers in Thailand
Brazilian expatriate sportspeople in Thailand